Xun Kuang (BCE), better known as Xunzi, was a Chinese philosopher of Confucianism who lived during the late Warring States period. After his predecessors Confucius and Mencius, Xunzi is often ranked as the third great Confucian philosopher of antiquity. By his time, Confucianism had suffered considerable criticism from Daoist and Mohist thinkers, and Xunzi is traditionally regarded as a synthesizer of these traditions with earlier Confucian thought. The result was a thorough and cohesive revision of Confucianism, which was crucial to the philosophy's ability to flourish in the Han dynasty and throughout the later history of East Asia. His works were compiled in the eponymous Xunzi, and survive in excellent condition. Unlike other ancient compilations, his authorship of these texts is generally secure, though it is likely that Western Han Dynasty historian Liu Xiang organized them into their present form centuries after Xunzi's death.

Born in the State of Zhao, Xunzi studied at the prestigious Jixia Academy, where he learned about every major philosophical tradition of his time. After his graduation, Xunzi traveled to Chu where he mastered poetry, and then returned to Qi as a highly-regarded teacher at the academy. His students Han Fei and Li Si each had an important political and academic careers, though some of their Legalist sentiments were at odds with his philosophy. Later in his life worked in the court of Lord Chunshen, whose death he died sometime after. The constant warfare of his time informed his work profoundly, as did his interactions with leaders and witnessing the downfall of various states.

Xunzi's writings respond to dozens of other thinkers, whom he often directly names and criticizes. His well-known notion that "Human nature is evil" has led many commentators to place him opposite of Mencius, who believed human nature was intrinsically good. Though like Mencius, Xunzi believed that education and ritual were the key to self-cultivation and thus the method to circumvent one's naturally foul nature. His definition of both concepts was loose, and he encouraged lifelong education and applied ritual to every aspect of life. Other important topics include the promotion of music and the careful application of names. Though he still cited the ancient sages, he differed from other Confucian philosophers by his insistence on emulating recent rulers rather than those of long ago. Repeated oversimplifications and misunderstandings on Xunzi's teachings, particularly his view on human nature, led to gradual dismissal and condemnation of his thought from the Tang dynasty onwards. By the rise of Neo-Confucianism in the 10th-century, Mencius gradually upended Xunzi, particularly by the choice to include the Mencius in the Four Books. Since the 20th-century, a reevaluation of Xunzi's doctrine has taken place in East Asia, leading to recognition of his profound impact and relevance to both his times and present day.

Sources and context
Detailed information concerning Xunzi is largely nonexistent. Yet when compared to the scarcity of knowledge for many other Ancient Chinese philosophers, there is meaningful and significant extant information on the life of Xunzi. The sinologist John H. Knoblock asserts that the sources available "permit not only a reconstruction of the outlines of career but also an understanding of his intellectual development". Xunzi's writings have survived in exceptionally good condition, and while they provide biographical details, the authenticity of this information is sometimes questionable. In addition to these, the main source for Xunzi's life is Sima Qian's Shiji (Records of the Grand Historian), which includes a biography of Xunzi (SJ, 74.12–14) and mentions of him in the biographies of both Li Si (SJ, 78.15) and Lord of Chunshen (SJ, 87.1–2, 14). The Western Han Dynasty historian Liu Xiang revised and expanded Sima Qian's initial biography for the preface of the first edition of Xunzi's writings. Some minor references to Xunzi also exist in Ying Shao's paraphrase of Liu Xiang's preface, as well as brief mentions in the Han Feizi, Zhan Guo Ce and Yantie Lun.

The Warring States period, an era of immense disunity and warfare, had been raging for over a hundred years by the time of Xunzi's birth in the late 4th-century BCE. Yet this time also saw considerable innovations in Chinese Philosophy, referred to as the Hundred Schools of Thought. The primary schools were Confucianism, Daoism, Legalism, Mohism, the School of Names, and the Yin–Yang School. Xunzi was a philosopher in the tradition of Confucianism, begun by Confucius who lived over two centuries before him.

Life and career

Youth and time in Qi (c. 310–284)

Xunzi was born as Xun Kuang, probably around 310 BCE but certainly before 279 BCE. In his time, he was probably known as Xun Qing, meaning 'Minister Xun', or 'Chamberlain Xun', after his later position. Some texts give his surname as Sun (孫) instead of Xun, though this may have been to avoid naming taboo during the reign of Emperor Xuan of Han (73–48 BCE), whose given name was Xun. He is best known by his honorary title Xunzi translated to 'Master Xun', with zi being a common epitaph for important philosophers. His birthplace was Zhao, a state in the modern-day Shanxi Province of north-central China. It is possible Xunzi was descended from the Xun family, an elite clan that had diminished following the Partition of Jin, though this is only speculation. The Eastern Han dynasty historian Ying Shao records that in his youth Xunzi was a "flowering talent" in matters of scholarship and academics. Essentially nothing else is known of Xunzi's background or upbringing, and thus any attempts to connect his philosophy with either topic are futile.

Sometime between age 13 and 15 (297 and 295 BCE), Xunzi traveled to the north eastern state of Qi. There he attended the Jixia Academy, which was the most important philosophical center in Ancient China, established by King Xuan. At the academy, Xunzi would have learned about all the major philosophical schools of his time, and been in the presence of scholars such as Zou Yan, Tian Pian, and Chunyu Kun. Xunzi would have learned the art of shuo, a formal argument of persuasion that philosophical authorities of the time used to advise rulers. After his academy study, Xunzi unsuccessfully attempted to persuade Lord Mengchang against continuing the extreme policies of Qi, though the historicity of this event is not certain. After the exchange, which is later recounted in his writings, Xunzi likely left Qi between 286 and 284 BCE.

Stay in Chu and return to Qi (c. 283–265)
Xunzi traveled to the state of Chu by 283 BCE, where he probably became acquainted with the nascent forms of the fu poetry style, particularly because of the poet's Qu Yuan residency there. Xunzi achieved considerable skill in the art, and his now-lost book of poems was well-regarded for many centuries. Chu was under especially frequent attacks from the Qin state, events which Xunzi would later recount in a conversation with Li Si. The solidity of Chu decreased so rapidly that Xunzi left around 275 BCE, returning to the more stable Qi state. He was warmly welcomed back in Qi, and held in very high-regard as an intellectual. The Shiji records that King Xiang of Qi had Xunzi sacrifice wine three times, a task that was reserved for the most respected scholar available. The eminence at which he was held suggests that Xunzi became the head of the Jixia Academy, but he is known to have taught there regardless. It was at this time that Xunzi composed much of his most important philosophical works, namely the chapters "Of Honor and Disgrace", "Of Kings and the Lords-Protector", "Discourse on Nature", "Discourse on Music", and "Man's Nature is Evil".

In his time, Xunzi was called "the most revered of teachers" (zui wei laoshi). His most famous pupils were Han Fei and Li Si, each who would have important political and academic careers. Xunzi's association with Li Si, the future Chancellor (or Prime Minister) of the Qin dynasty would later tarnish his reputation. The timeline for his academy teaching is unclear, though he seemed to have considered other posts after being slandered. He left Qi in around 265 BCE, around the time when King Jian succeeded Xiang.

Travels and later career (c. 265 – after 238)

Xunzi's writings suggest that after leaving Qi he visited Qin, possibly from 265 BCE to 260 BCE. He aimed to convert the state's leaders to follow his philosophy of leadership, a task which proved difficult because of the strong hold that Shang Yang's Legalist sentiments had there. In a conversation with the Qin official Fan Sui, Xunzi praised much of the state's achievements, officials and governmental organizations. Still, Xunzi found issues with the state, primarily its lack of Confucian scholars and the fear it inspires, which Xunzi claimed would result in the surrounding states uniting up against. Xunzi then met with King Zhaoxiang, arguing that Qin's lack of Confucian scholars and educational encouragement would be detrimental to the state's future. The king was unconvinced by Xunzi's persuasion, and did not offer him a post in his court.

In around 260 BCE, Xunzi returned to his native Zhao, where he debated military affairs with Lord Linwu in the court of King Xiaocheng of Zhao. He remained in Zhao until  BCE.

In 240 BCE Lord Chunshen, the prime minister of Chu, invited him to take a position as Magistrate of Lanling, which he initially refused and then accepted. However, Lord Chunshen was assassinated In 238 BCE by a court rival and Xunzi subsequently lost his position. He retired, remained in Lanling, a region in what is today's southern Shandong province, for the rest of his life and was buried there. The year of his death is unknown, though if he lived to see the ministership of his student Li Si, as recounted, he would have lived into his nineties, dying shortly after 219 BCE.

Philosophy

Human Nature – xing
The best known and most cited section of the Xunzi is chapter 23, "Human Nature is Evil". Human nature, known as xing, was a topic which Confucius commented on somewhat ambiguously, leaving much room for later philosophers to expand upon. Like Shang Yang, Xunzi believed that humanity's inborn tendencies were evil and that ethical norms had been invented to rectify people. His variety of Confucianism therefore has a darker, more pessimistic flavor than the optimistic Confucianism of Mencius, who tended to view humans as innately good. Like most Confucians, however, he believed that people could be refined through education and ritual.

Music – yue
Music is discussed throughout the Xunzi, particularly in chapter 20, the "Discourse on Music" (Yuelun). Much of the Xunzi's sentiments on music are directed towards Mozi, who largely disparaged music. Mozi held that music provides no basic needs and is a waste of resources and money. Xunzi presents a comprehensive argument in opposition, stating that certain music provides joy, which is indeed essential to human wellbeing. Joy and Music are respectively translated as yue and le, and their connection in Xunzi's time may explain why both words share the same Chinese character: . Xunzi also points out the use of music for social harmony:

Many commentators have noted the similarities between the reasons for Xunzi's promotion of music and those of Ancient Greek philosophers.

Gentleman – junzi
Ultimately, he refused to admit theories of state and administration apart from ritual and self-cultivation, arguing for the gentleman, rather than the measurements promoted by the Legalists, as the wellspring of objective criterion. His ideal gentleman (junzi) king and government, aided by a class of erudites (Confucian scholars), are similar to that of Mencius, but without the tolerance of feudalism since he rejected hereditary titles and believed that an individual's status in the social hierarchy should be determined only by their own merit.

Modern editions
  Reprinted (1966), Taipei: Chengwen.

References

Notes

Citations

Sources
Books and chapters
 
 
 
 
 

Journal and encyclopedia articles

Further reading

External links

 
 Full text of the Xunzi (in Chinese)

310s BC births
3rd-century BC Chinese people
3rd-century BC deaths
3rd-century BC Chinese philosophers
Chinese Confucianists
Chinese ethicists
Philosophers from Shanxi
Philosophers of language
Writers from Shanxi
Zhou dynasty essayists
Zhou dynasty philosophers
Relationship between Heaven and Mankind